Neta Lavi (born 25 August 1996) is an Israeli footballer who plays as a defensive midfielder for Gamba Osaka and the Israel national team.

Club career
In 2010, Lavi joined the Maccabi Haifa youth team. He became captain of the Maccabi Haifa youth team that won the double in 2014.

Lavi has made his official debut for the senior Maccabi Haifa on 28 October 2015 in a game against Hapoel Ironi Kiryat Shmona in the Toto Cup. Lavi made his Israeli Premier League debut for the senior Maccabi Haifa on 7 December 2015, in a match against Hapoel Haifa.

On 27 January 2023 signed for J1 League club Gamba Osaka.

International career
Lavi was part of the Israeli youth national team and Played 8 times for the Israeli U-19 and 12 times for the Israeli U-21 national side, under Israeli manager Arik Benado.

Lavis made his debut for the senior Israel national team on 31 May 2016, coming on as a substitute during a friendly match against Serbia.

Honours
Maccabi Haifa
 Israeli Premier League: 2020–21, 2021–22
 Israel State Cup: 2015–16
 Toto Cup: 2021–22
 Israel Super Cup: 2021

References

1996 births
Living people
Israeli footballers
Footballers from Haifa District
Maccabi Haifa F.C. players
Gamba Osaka players
Israeli Premier League players
J1 League players
Israel international footballers
Israel youth international footballers
Israeli expatriate footballers
Expatriate footballers in Japan
Israeli expatriate sportspeople in Japan
Association football midfielders